The Eli Lotar Park is a  public park and playground located on the Quai Jean-Marie Tjibaou, along the canal Saint-Denis in the commune of Aubervilliers, France. The park is named after French photographer and cinematographer Eli Lotar.

References 

Parks in France